SpyHunter: Nowhere to Run is an action racing video game developed by Terminal Reality and published by Midway Games released for PlayStation 2 and Xbox. A version for Microsoft Windows was released in 2009, ported by Steel Monkeys. It is the first (and currently only) installment in the Spy Hunter series to allow the player to play as the character and not only the vehicle. Nowhere to Run was intended to be a tie-in to a movie by the same name. The film got stuck in development hell and the game was released as a stand-alone. The game stars Dwayne Johnson as government agent Alex Decker, who replaces Alec Sects, the "SpyHunter" who was to have been the main character of the movie.

Plot 
Alex Decker, an agent of the International Espionage Service, is transporting an unknown cargo when he is pursued by NOSTRA agents. After escaping the agents, he meets with Karin, another IES agent. Alex and Karin engage in a gun fight against NOSTRA agents. The shipment Alex was carrying is confiscated by Gomez, the NOSTRA leader. Alex's Interceptor performance car is confiscated, and Karin disappears.

A year later, Alex traces his Interceptor to a freighter offshore. With the help of another agent, he downloads codes to recover his car and steal the ship's cargo. As Decker escapes the ship, he is pursued by NOSTRA agents. After a long and arduous chase, Decker escapes the agents and reaches the IES base safely. The base is attacked by the NOSTRA agents, but the IES successfully defend the base. The director of the IES is taken hostage, and the IES launches a counterattack on the NOSTRA base. Upon rescuing the director, Alex pursues Olaf in a lengthy chase, and eventually meets him upon a NOSTRA train. Alex defeats him by throwing him out of the train. The damaged train reaches a secret NOSTRA base, where Alex finds and defeats Cyrus and Marduk.
	
Decker sneaks onto a NOSTRA plane and tries to fight Gomez, but Gomez escapes. Karin and Decker use an Interceptor to fly out of the plane and pursue Gomez. The fates of the three characters are not revealed.

Reception 

The game received "mixed" reviews according to the review aggregation website Metacritic. It was praised for its script and acting, but highly criticized for its lack of power ups and uninspiring gameplay when outside of a vehicle.

The Times gave the PlayStation 2 version a score of three stars out of five, praising the cinematic feel of the game, but was critical to the gameplay mechanics. Detroit Free Press gave the game two stars out of four. Chris McCarver of 411Mania gave the PS2 version 3.5 out of 10, criticizing the presentation, on-foot gameplay elements and graphics.

In 2017, at The Game Awards 2017, Dwayne Johnson recalled his time with the game and its poor reception, sarcastically stating "I'm still loving that 3/10 review from Game Informer, by the way. 3 out of 10! Thanks, guys. I'm still pissed at that!" while holding up his middle finger. Kevin Hart jokingly states "3 out of 10 is not that bad!", referring to the game.

References

External links 
 

2006 video games
Action video games
Midway video games
PlayStation 2 games
Spy Hunter
Video games featuring black protagonists
Video games scored by Alexander Brandon
Video games scored by Sascha Dikiciyan
Video games developed in the United States
Video game reboots
Xbox games
Terminal Reality games
Single-player video games